Mohammad Naveed (born 3 June 1987) is a cricketer who played for the United Arab Emirates national cricket team. He made his One Day International (ODI) debut for the United Arab Emirates against Afghanistan on 2 May 2014. He made his Twenty20 International (T20I) debut against Scotland in the 2015 ICC World Twenty20 Qualifier tournament on 9 July 2015. In January 2019, he captained the UAE for the first time in an ODI, in their home series against Nepal. In March 2021, Naveed was found guilty of corruption and banned from all cricket for eight years.

Career
In January 2018, he was named in the United Arab Emirates' squad for the 2018 ICC World Cricket League Division Two tournament.

On 4 March 2018, in the United Arab Emirates' match against Papua New Guinea in the 2018 Cricket World Cup Qualifier, he took his first five-wicket haul in an ODI. The United Arab Emirates won the match by 56 runs, and Naveed was named the man of the match. On 22 March 2018, in the United Arab Emirates' final match of the Cricket World Cup Qualifier, against Zimbabwe, Naveed took three wickets for 40 runs, and he was again named the man of the match. On 3 June 2018, he was selected to play for the Toronto Nationals in the players' draft for the inaugural edition of the Global T20 Canada tournament.

In August 2018, he was named in the United Arab Emirates' squad for the 2018 Asia Cup Qualifier tournament. In September 2018, he was named in Kandahar's squad in the first edition of the Afghanistan Premier League tournament.

In December 2018, he was named in the United Arab Emirates' team for the 2018 ACC Emerging Teams Asia Cup.

In January 2019, he was named as the captain of the United Arab Emirates' ODI squad for their series against Nepal. This was after the UAE's regular captain, Rohan Mustafa, was suspended by the Emirates Cricket Board (ECB) for breaching the ECB's Player's Code of Conduct, with Naveed named as captain in his place.

In June 2019, he was selected to play for the Montreal Tigers franchise team in the 2019 Global T20 Canada tournament.

Ban from cricket
In September 2019, he was named as the captain of the United Arab Emirates' squad for the 2019 ICC T20 World Cup Qualifier tournament in the UAE. However, the following month Naveed was withdrawn from the UAE's squad, with Ahmed Raza named as captain in his place. Two days before the start of the tournament, the ICC confirmed that Naveed had been suspended, after breaching cricket's anti-corruption rules. In February 2020, Naveed said that he wanted to clear his name, but could face a ban of up to ten years if the corruption charges are proven.

In January 2021, the ICC found him guilty of corruption in relation to attempted match-fixing. In March 2021, Naveed was given an eight-year ban from playing ICC cricket, backdated to 16 October 2019, after being found guilty on charges of corruption. In response to the ban, Naveed issued a statement saying that he was not involved in match-fixing and his only mistake was not reporting a corrupt approach.

References

External links
 

1987 births
Living people
Emirati cricketers
United Arab Emirates One Day International cricketers
United Arab Emirates Twenty20 International cricketers
Cricketers at the 2015 Cricket World Cup
Kandahar Knights cricketers
Sportspeople from Dubai
Cricketers banned for corruption
Pakistani expatriate sportspeople in the United Arab Emirates